Gen. Maha Nawrahta (called Mang Maha Noratha by Damrong Rajanubhab; d. March 1767) was joint commander-in-chief of the Royal Burmese Army from 1765 to 1767. The general is best known for commanding the southern invasion force in the Burmese invasion of Siam (1765–1767). He and Ne Myo Thihapate jointly commanded the 14-month-long siege of Ayutthaya, the capital of Siam. He died just a few weeks before the Burmese armies succeeded. He was buried with extraordinary honors by royal decree.

References

Burmese generals
1767 deaths
Year of birth unknown